Daniele Musa (born 10 September 1972) is a former professional tennis player from Italy.

Career
Musa, who was runner-up in the 1990 Italian 18s Championships, made it through qualifying at the 1994 US Open. He lost in the opening round to 13th seed Thomas Muster.

He won the Recife Challenger tournament in 1994.

The Italian reached the second round of two ATP Tour tournaments in 1995, at Kitzbuhel and the New Haven Open.

Challenger titles

Singles: (1)

Doubles: (1)

References

1972 births
Living people
Italian male tennis players
Tennis players from Rome